Loire (or Leir) is a landlocked département in the Auvergne-Rhône-Alpes region of France occupying the river Loire's upper reaches. Its prefecture is Saint-Étienne. It had a population of 765,634 in 2019.

History 

Loire was created in 1793 when the Rhône-et-Loire département was split into two, about 3½ years after it was created. This was a response to counter-revolutionary activities in Lyon which, by population, was the country's second largest city. By splitting Rhône-et-Loire the government sought to protect the French Revolution from the potential power and influence of counter revolutionary activity in the Lyon region.

The departmental capitals (prefectures) throughout its history are as follows:

 Feurs 1793–1795
 Montbrison 1795–1855
 Saint-Étienne since 1855

Geography 

Loire is part of the current administrative region of Auvergne-Rhône-Alpes and is surrounded by the départements of Rhône, Isère, Ardèche, Haute-Loire, Puy-de-Dôme, Allier, and Saône-et-Loire.

The river Loire traverses the department from south to north.

The Loire département is divided into three arrondissements:

 Arrondissement of Montbrison 
 Arrondissement of Roanne 
 Arrondissement of Saint-Étienne

Parts of the department belong to Parc naturel régional Livradois-Forez.

Demographics
The inhabitants of the département are called Ligériens. The industrial city of Saint-Étienne with its agglomeration contains about half of the inhabitants of the département.

Population development since 1801:

Principal towns

The most populous commune is Saint-Étienne, the prefecture. As of 2019, there are 6 communes with more than 15,000 inhabitants:

Politics

The president of the Departmental Council is Georges Ziegler, elected in October 2017.

Current National Assembly Representatives

Tourism

See also 

 Auvergne-Rhône-Alpes 
 Cantons of the Loire department 
 Communes of the Loire department 
 Arrondissements of the Loire department 
 Loire coal mining basin 
 Loire General Council

References

External links 

  Prefecture website
  Loire Departmental Council website

 
Massif Central
1793 establishments in France
Departments of Auvergne-Rhône-Alpes
States and territories established in 1793